The Government Digital Service is a unit of the Government of the United Kingdom's Cabinet Office tasked with transforming the provision of online public services. It was formed in April 2011 to implement the "Digital by Default" strategy proposed by a report produced for the Cabinet Office in 2010 called 'Directgov 2010 and beyond: revolution not evolution'. It is overseen by the Public Expenditure Executive (Efficiency & Reform). GDS is primarily based in the Whitechapel Building, London. Its CEO is Tom Read.

GOV.UK
On 20 July 2010, Directgov, the citizen services website, was moved to the Cabinet Office from the Department for Work and Pensions. From 1 April 2011 Directgov became part of the Government Digital Service, along with the BusinessLink website aimed at business users. On 13 September 2012, through a notice on the Directgov homepage, it was announced that the GOV.UK project, built by the Government Digital Service, would replace Directgov as the primary citizen website of the UK Government on 17 October 2012, after which both Directgov and BusinessLink would close.

"Digital by Default" strategy
The strategy was proposed in a report called "Directgov 2010 and beyond: revolution not evolution" prepared by Martha Lane Fox, the founder of lastminute.com. In an interview, Francis Maude, minister with responsibility for GDS has spoken about "powerful oligopolies" and the reliance on a single supplier as a cause of high-profile failures in public sector IT, such as NHS Connecting for Health. GDS is intended to "drive service delivery to digital across government and provide support, advice and technical expertise for departments as they develop new digital delivery models". This strategy is focussed on the application of Agile software development and Lean software development methodologies, supplied primarily via small and medium enterprises rather than large suppliers.

GDS has a Digital Advisory Board consisting of high-profile external experts, which meets bi-annually and advises the GDS on strategy.

As of 2013, less than 2 years after GDS began, GDS had over 200 staff; by 2015 that number had risen to approximately 500.

Government as a platform
GDS has since mid 2013 promoted the concept of government as a platform, an idea first set out by Tim O'Reilly in 2009 in an article in Forbes. Government as a Platform introduces "a new vision for digital government; a common core infrastructure of shared digital systems, technology and processes on which it’s easy to build brilliant, user-centric government services".

GOV.UK Verify

In 2011, GDS was given responsibility for setting cross-government standards for identity assurance, with the authority to approve, commission and accredit the identity component of any central government public service. GDS then designed and is building GOV.UK Verify. GOV.UK Verify is intended to act as a single sign on framework for government services like filing taxes or checking driving license information. The system allows the user to choose from a list of companies certified to verify their identity to government. These companies have to meet published standards for identity assurance.

The Infrastructure and Projects Authority (IPA) conducted a review of Verify in July 2018, and found Whitehall departments were reluctant to continue funding the project. A subsequent report by the IPA recommended that the Gov.uk Verify identity assurance programme should be terminated.

Legacy
The GDS service has influenced similar projects elsewhere in the world, including the United States Digital Service, 18F, the Canadian Digital Service and the DigitalService4Germany.

Parliamentary review 
In July 2018, the Science and Technology Select Committee announced that it would be carrying out a review into the work of GDS.

See also
 Central Computer and Telecommunications Agency
 Office of the e-Envoy
 E-Government Unit
 Mike Bracken
 Transformational Government

References

External links 
 
 Government Digital Service blog
 Commons Select Committee review

2011 establishments in the United Kingdom
Government agencies established in 2011
Government Digital Service